Central Punjab is a domestic cricket team in Pakistan representing the northern and central parts of the Punjab province. It competes in domestic first-class, List A and T20 cricket competitions, namely the Quaid-e-Azam Trophy, Pakistan Cup and National T20 Cup. The team is operated by the Central Punjab Cricket Association.

History
The team was introduced as a part of a new domestic structure introduced by the Pakistan Cricket Board (PCB) on 31 August 2019. On 3 September 2019, PCB confirmed the inaugural squad for the team. Babar Azam was announced as the captain of the team.

2019/20 season 
Central Punjab won the Quaid-e-Azam Trophy, defeating Northern by an innings and 16 runs in the final. The team was eliminated in the group stage of the National T20 Cup. The Pakistan Cup was cancelled this season due to the Covid-19 pandemic.

2020/21 season 
The team came back from a bad start in defence of the Quaid-e-Azam Trophy to win five successive matches and reach the final. The final against Khyber Pakhtunkhwa resulted in a tie, and they were declared joint winners. The team again struggled in the limited overs formats, finishing in fourth and fifth place respectively in the Pakistan Cup and National T20 Cup.

Structure

As of 2019, domestic cricket in Pakistan was reorganised into six regional teams (on provincial lines). A three tier bottom-up system is in operation with the Tier 1 teams participating in the Quaid-e-Azam Trophy (First Class), Pakistan Cup (List A) and National T20 Cup (Regional T20). The Tier 2 teams participate in the City Cricket Association Tournament whilst the Tier 3 teams participate in various local tournaments as both tiers feed players to the Tier 1 team. 
 Tier 1: Central Punjab
 Tier 2: Lahore (East), Lahore (West), Lahore (North), Gujranwala, Sheikhupura, Kasur, Sialkot, Narowal, Hafizabad, Gujrat, Mandi Bahauddin, Faisalabad, Sargodha, Mianwali, Jhang & Bhakkar.
 Tier 3: Various Clubs & Schools.

Current squad
Squad for the 2021–22 season:-

See also
 Balochistan cricket team
 Khyber Pakhtunkhwa cricket team
 Northern cricket team
 Sindh cricket team
 Southern Punjab cricket team

References

Cricket teams in Pakistan
Central Punjab cricketers